The 1983 UEFA Super Cup was a two-legged match contested between the European Cup winners Hamburger SV, and the European Cup Winners' Cup champions Aberdeen.

The match was 0–0 in the first leg at the Volksparkstadion in Hamburg. In the second leg at Pittodrie Stadium, Aberdeen added their second European trophy with a 2–0 victory over the West Germans with goals coming from Mark McGhee and Neil Simpson. Aberdeen became the first Scottish team to win the UEFA Super Cup.

Details

First leg

Second leg

See also
1982–83 European Cup
1982–83 European Cup Winners' Cup
UEFA Super Cup
Aberdeen F.C. in European football

References

External links
UEFA Super Cup

1983–84 in European football
Hamburger SV matches
Aberdeen F.C. matches
1983
1983
1983
1983–84 in German football
1983–84 in Scottish football
November 1983 sports events in Europe
December 1983 sports events in Europe
1980s in Hamburg
20th century in Aberdeen
1983 
Sports competitions in Hamburg
Football in Aberdeen